"Genre-busting" is a term used occasionally in reviews of written work, music and visual art and refers to the author or artist's ability to cross over two or more established styles. For instance, in writing, to combine the horror genre with a western or hard-boiled detective story with science fiction. In music, the term may refer to a song combining styles or defying classification.

The sound of the term calls to mind other uses of "buster" such as "crime buster", "Gangbusters", "Ghostbusters", "Dambusters", etc.

Creative people don't always feel comfortable working within an established category. So genre-busting within the publishing world has become a type of literary fiction. The publisher Atticus Books has gone so far as to declare, on their website: "We specialize in genre-busting literary fiction—i.e., titles that fall between the cracks of genre fiction and compelling narratives that feature memorable main characters."

The Video Movie Guide 1998 stated in its foreword, "In past years, reviews in VMG have been broken down into genre categories. Now, by popular demand, we are listing all movies together in alphabetical order.... So many movies today mix genres... and there are no clear-cut categories anymore."

Interviewed in Mustard comedy magazine in 2005, writer Alan Moore said: "I mean, this is probably a bad thing to say to someone from a comedy magazine, but I don't like genre. I think that genre was made up by some spotty clerk in WH Smiths in the 1920s to make his worthless fucking job a little easier for him: "it'd be easier if these books said what they were about on the spine. Going on to say: "In the novel, I'm writing, Jerusalem, there's an awful lot of funny stuff, and there's supernatural stuff; there's stuff in the prologue that's as good as Stephen King and it's just a description of my brother walking through a block of flats. It's horror. And there's social history, there's political stuff. Why not mix it all together? Because that's what life is actually like. We laugh, we cry, you know, we buy the t-shirt."

Examples

Anime and manga 

 Redo of Healer – a dark fantasy manga series with rape and revenge story with harem genre.

Films 

 Bones & All – a road film with a teenage romance genre with cannibal horror story based on a novel of the same name by Camille DeAngelis. The film was directed by Luca Guadagnino.

See also

References

External links
 Guardian newspaper article: Genre Busting

Genres
Culture
The arts
Mass media